Trinity Walk is a shopping centre  in Wakefield, West Yorkshire. England.  Opened on 6 May 2011, Wakefield Council describe it as "the most important City Centre development for more than 20 years." The centre was built to supplement the larger Ridings Centre.

Retail scheme

Trinity Walk is 500,000 sq ft partially enclosed shopping centre with over 55 stores and 1000 car parking spaces, with access from Wakefield’s inner city ring road (A61) and the main bus station. The centre contains major stores, including an 8,500 m² Sainsbury's and retailers Next, New Look, and Pandora.

The centre recorded its record year for footfall in 2015 with around 11.22 million shopping visits, up 4% on 2014. It also saw its busiest ever week in December 2015 after welcoming around 289,000 shoppers.

History

On 19 March 2009, it appeared that the development was going to fall victim to the credit crunch when KPMG were called in as administrators as the Anglo Irish Bank withdrew its support for the project. Building work stopped and the steel structure stood half finished.

The scheme was rescued in early 2010 by a consortium who bought the development from administrators - a joint venture company comprising Sovereign Land, AREA Property Partners, and Shepherd Building Group.

Trinity Walk opened on Friday 6 May 2011.

Wakefield regeneration

Trinity Walk has created hundreds of new jobs in the city.

See also
The Ridings Centre

References

Buildings and structures in Wakefield
Shopping centres in West Yorkshire
Shopping malls established in 2011
2011 establishments in England